Siculiana is a town and comune in the province of Agrigento, Sicily, southern Italy,  west of the provincial capital Agrigento.

Geography 

Siculiana Marina is a suburban seaside village of Siculiana on the Strait of Sicily. Once an important settlement for maritime trade in the Mediterranean, with a prominent commercial Marketplace emporium, it is now a popular summer resort. The Caricatore (Loading Dock) was still active up to the end of 19th century.

Monuments
The ruins of the once-embattled Castello Chiaramonte, near the coast, is a prominent feature of the landscape. Within the city, the Baroque church Santuario del Santissimo Crocifisso is a well-known landmark. Inside is revered the Black Crucifix, which was moved to the church in 1611 from the castle in which it was previously kept.

Museo Mete

People

Francesco Agnello, Baron of Siculiana, musicologist, president of the Association "Amici della musica" - Palermo
Frank Sivero, an American character actor
Giuseppe Basile, Surgeon - Doctor of Garibaldi
Blasco Isfar e Corillas, Baron of Siculiana

References

External links